Urgani is a rural locality (a selo) in Tsugninsky Selsoviet, Akushinsky District, Republic of Dagestan, Russia. The population was 407 as of 2010. There are 23 streets.

Geography 
Urgani is located 25 km south of Akusha (the district's administrative centre) by road, on the Tsugnikotta River. Gulebki is the nearest rural locality.

References 

Rural localities in Akushinsky District